The Anglican Diocese of Arochukwu/Ohafia is one of nine within the Anglican Province of Aba, itself one of 14 provinces within the Church of Nigeria. The current bishop is Johnson Onuoha

Notes

Dioceses of the Province of Aba
 
Arochukwu Ohafia